This is a list of seasons completed by the Virginia Cavaliers men's basketball team. The Cavaliers won the NCAA Tournament Championship in 2019. The team was a charter member of the Southern Conference in 1921 until becoming an independent in 1937 and finally a member of the Atlantic Coast Conference in 1953. Virginia has finished first in the ACC a total of nine times, which is third best all-time.

Season-by-season results

References

 
Virginia
Virginia Cavaliers basketball seasons